Wu Prefecture may refer to:

Wuzhou (historical prefecture in Hebei), a prefecture in modern Hebei, China in the 9th and 10th centuries
Wuzhou (historical prefecture in Ningxia and Gansu), a prefecture in modern Ningxia and Gansu, China in the 9th and 10th centuries

See also
Wu (disambiguation)
Wuzhou (disambiguation)